The Marche regional election of 2010 took place on 28–29 March 2010.

Gian Mario Spacca of the Democratic Party, supported also by the Union of the Centre and Alliance for Italy, defeated by a comfortable margin his centre-right opponent Erminio Marinelli and, thus, secured a second consecutive term as President. The People of Freedom was narrowly the largest party in the region.

Results
Source: La Repubblica

Elections in Marche
2010 elections in Italy